Harry Almond (10 April 1928 – 17 October 2004) was a British rower. He competed in the men's coxless four event at the 1952 Summer Olympics.

References

1928 births
2004 deaths
British male rowers
Olympic rowers of Great Britain
Rowers at the 1952 Summer Olympics
Sportspeople from Blackpool